Luciana Carro (born March 23, 1981) is a Canadian actress best known for her appearances on the television series Battlestar Galactica, Caprica, and Falling Skies and in movies such as Two for the Money and Dr. Dolittle 3.

Early life
Carro was born in Toronto, Ontario, Canada. She was encouraged to act by her parents as a way of overcoming her shyness. With the encouragement of her high school drama teacher Gerry Campbell (father of Neve Campbell), she attended theater school.

Career
Carro began her career with roles in The Chris Isaak Show, Smallville, and The L Word. These led to a part in Battlestar Galactica TV series as Louanne "Kat" Katraine. Like many characters, Kat was intended as a one-off, appearing as a  trainee Viper pilot, but producers liked Carro's performance and made Kat a recurring role. Katraine became a rival to Starbuck and at times the Galactica'''s CAG.

Carro subsequently starred in  Dr. Dolittle 3 and alongside Al Pacino in Two for the Money. She was also cast in the recurring roles of Stephanie Meyer in Everwood,   Priyah Magnus in Caprica, Crazy Lee in Falling Skies, and Anana in Helix''.

Filmography

References

External links

 
 
 Luciana Carro at the Battlestar Wiki

1981 births
Living people
Canadian people of Italian descent
Canadian film actresses
Canadian television actresses
Actresses from Toronto
Actresses from Vancouver
21st-century Canadian actresses